The Fun of Watching Fireworks is the debut album by The American Analog Set. It was released on August 20, 1996 on Emperor Jones records.

Track listing

References

1996 albums
The American Analog Set albums